Euphorbia nesemannii, commonly known as Nesemann's euphorbia, is a species of plant in the family Euphorbiaceae native to the Western Cape province in South Africa.

Banker and naturalist Alfred Nesemann discovered this species in 1930, near Robertson. Robert Allen Dyer named it after Nesemann.

References 

nesemannii
nesemannii